Ballolli is a village in the southern state of Karnataka, India. It is located in the Indi taluk of Bijapur district in Karnataka.

The village of Ballolli in Bijapur District of the Famous Center, probably of Ist Standard To Pu College and The college was located in a spacious hall, Famous Shree Virabhadreswar Temple the college could attract students from different parts of the country.

See also
 Bijapur district, Karnataka
 Districts of Karnataka

References

External links
 http://Bijapur.nic.in/

Villages in Bijapur district, Karnataka

vi:Bijjaragi, Bijapur